Michels syndrome is a syndrome characterised by intellectual disability, craniosynostosis, blepharophimosis, ptosis, epicanthus inversus, highly arched eyebrows, and hypertelorism. People with Michels syndrome vary in other symptoms such as asymmetry of the skull, eyelid, and anterior chamber anomalies, cleft lip and palate, umbilical anomalies, and growth and cognitive development.

See also 
 Malpuech facial clefting syndrome, another condition in the 3MC spectrum

References

External links

Syndromes with craniofacial abnormalities
Congenital disorders
Autosomal recessive disorders
Rare syndromes